The Castellers de Vilafranca is a cultural and sporting association whose main objective is to build castells (human towers). It has the status of a public-interest association. The group was founded in 1948 in response to the increased interest in human tower building in Vilafranca del Penedès, a Catalan tradition that has evolved since the 18th century Ball de Valencians, a dance from Valencia.

In 2010, the Castellers de Vilafranca had about 400 active human tower building members.

History

The Castellers de Vilafranca cultural association was founded in September 1948 by Oriol Rossell, who became the first cap de colla (Leader/Technical Manager of the group). The group started with seven-level towers, and forged close relationships with casteller groups in other towns. The first caps de colla were Oriol Rossell (1948–1952) and Ramon Sala (1953–1955). The group originally wore rose-coloured shirts, and later red ones.

In 1956, the group became almost inactive due to internal disagreements and disputes. In 1957, it reorganized and elected to wear green shirts, which is still used by the group today. From 1957 to 1968, seven-level towers were the norm, and the cinc de set was the highest tower achieved. From 1969 to 1974, the group built the first towers in the eight-level category: the torre de set, quatre de vuit, tres de vuit, pilar de sis, and the torre de vuit amb folre. In 1972, the group won the Concurs de castells de Tarragona, the Human Towers Competition held biennially in Tarragona city in the south of Catalonia. During those years, the caps de colla were Josep Pedrol (1957–1959), Carles Domènech (1960–1961), Joan Bolet (1962–1963), Gabi Martínez (1964–1969), Lluís Giménez (1970–1973) and Gabi Martínez, again (1974).

In 1975, the group went through internal restructuring, shifting from the very personal and almost-exclusive leadership of the cap de colla to management of the technical side of tower-building by a consensual team. In 1981, it was decided that team members would no longer be individually paid. This provoked a division in the group.

From 1975 to 1982, eight-level towers were performed frequently but with difficulties. In 1983 and 1984, the group regained its strength in this category and, in 1985, it built the first cinc de vuit. In 1987, they built the first tres and quatre de nou amb folre (carregat), and in 1989 the first completely successful tres de nou amb folre (descarregat) was achieved. In 1990, the first quatre de nou amb folre (descarregat) was built. The cap de colla between 1975 and 1994 was Carles Domènech.

Between 1995 and 2004, the highest towers were achieved: descarregats (completely and successfully dismantled), the torre de nou amb folre i manilles, pilar de set amb folre, pilar de vuit amb folre i manilles, quatre de vuit amb l’agulla, quatre de nou amb folre i l’agulla (the first one in human tower history), cinc de nou amb folre, and tres and quatre de nou amb folre built simultaneously (the first and only time in human tower history). The towers that were carregats (reached the top but collapsed afterwards) were the torre de vuit, quatre de nou, and the tres de deu amb folre i manilles (the first one in human towers history).

The group won the Tarragona Human Towers Competition in 1996, 1998, 2002, 2004, 2006, 2008, 2010, and 2012. In 2005, Castellers de Vilafranca achieved the torre de nou amb folre, which is considered the most difficult tower ever done by any group to date.

Francesc Moreno "Melilla" was the cap de colla between 1995 and 2003, and Lluís Esclassans from 2004 to 2007. David Miret was elected the new cap de colla in December 2007.

Castells achieved
Castellers de Vilafranca have achieved in their history most of the constructions that have been seen in any performance. You will find below the detailed list of human constructions and the date in which they were topped or dismantled for the first time :

Cal Figarot, the group's headquarters

Cal Figarot is the group's headquarters. The neogothic-style building, built by August Font de Carreres at the end of the 19th century, was acquired in 1983. An adjacent warehouse was bought in 1998, and both buildings were renovated. The warehouse has an interior open space of 600 square metres. Training sessions take place in the courtyard.

Castellers de Vilafranca in the world

Countries where the Castellers de Vliafranca have performed include France, Italy, Lexembourg, Germany, the Netherlands, Belgium, Denmark, Chile, India, and New York City.

In 1988, they performed in Italy during the celebration of the thousandth anniversary of Catalonia. They performed in the Universal Exposition Seville'92 (1992), during the Catalonia day and in Brussels, Belgium (2010) supporting the nomination of Castells to UNESCO Heritage. The Castellers de Vilafranca also performed in the opening ceremony of the XXV Olympic Games in Barcelona in 1992.

The Castellers de Vilafranca have toured extensively in the Països Catalans (territories in which the varieties of Catalan are traditionally spoken):
 Performances in Northern Catalonia: six times in Perpignan (1970, 1977, 1982, 1989, 1997 and 1998), in Toluges (1970), in Collioure (1984), in Banyuls de la Marenda (1986), three times in Vilafranca de Conflent (1985, 1988, 1989), in the Saint Michel de Cuxa monastery (1985), Prada de Conflent (1988) and in Baó, in the framework of the First meeting of the catalanitat in North Catalonia (2002).
 Four times in Andorra: in Encamp (1971), Andorra la Vella and Sant Julià de Lòria (1976), in Escaldes and again in Andorra la Vella (1983) and Escaldes (1985).
 Two tours in the Valencia Region: the first one was in Ribera del Xúquer (1979), and in the second one (1981) the group performed in Alcoi, Benidorm and Alicante. Subsequently they performed in Carcaixent (1985), Algemesí (1993, 2000), Castellón (2000).
 One tour in Palma, Majorca (1980) and Manacor, Menorca (2001).
 One tour, already mentioned, in Alghero (1978).

Gallery

References

External links

Castellers de Vilafranca
Canal Castellers de Vilafranca à YouTube

Castellers
Sport in Catalonia